The 2017 Barcelona Open Banco Sabadell (also known as the Torneo Godó) was a men's tennis tournament played on outdoor clay courts. It was the 65th edition of the event and part of the ATP World Tour 500 series of the 2017 ATP World Tour. It took place at the Real Club de Tenis Barcelona in Barcelona, Catalonia, Spain, from April 24 through April 30, 2017.

Points and prize money

Points distribution

Prize money

Singles main-draw entrants

Seeds

1 Rankings as of April 17, 2017.

Other entrants
The following players received wildcards into the main draw:
  Albert Montañés
  Andy Murray
  Tommy Robredo
  Mikael Ymer
  Alexander Zverev

The following players received entry from the qualifying draw:
  Chung Hyeon
  Taro Daniel
  Steven Diez
  Santiago Giraldo
  Thiago Monteiro
  Casper Ruud

The following player received entry as a lucky loser:
  Yūichi Sugita

Withdrawals
Before the tournament
  Tomáš Berdych →replaced by  Renzo Olivo
  Kei Nishikori (wrist injury) →replaced by  Yūichi Sugita
  Yoshihito Nishioka →replaced by  Dustin Brown
  Donald Young →replaced by  Radu Albot

Doubles main-draw entrants

Seeds

 Rankings are as of April 17, 2017.

Other entrants
The following pairs received wildcards into the doubles main draw:
  Pablo Carreño Busta /  Juan Carlos Ferrero
  Jaume Munar /  Albert Ramos Viñolas

The following pair received entry from the qualifying draw:
  Marcus Daniell /  Marcelo Demoliner

Champions

Singles

  Rafael Nadal def.  Dominic Thiem, 6–4, 6–1

Doubles

  Florin Mergea /  Aisam-ul-Haq Qureshi def.  Philipp Petzschner /  Alexander Peya, 6–4, 6–3

References

External links
Official website

Barcelona Open Banco Sabadell
2017 in Catalan sport
Barcelona Open Banco Sabadell
2010s in Barcelona
April 2017 events in Spain
Barcelona Open (tennis)